For other islands with similar names, see Gruney (disambiguation)

Sound Gruney is one of the Shetland islands.

Geography
Gruney means a "green island", and "sound" refers to the strait.

Daaey is to the south east, and Urie Lingey to the east. The latter is 1 km north of Urie Ness on Fetlar, hence the name. Wedder Holm, south of Uyea, is to the north east.

References

Uninhabited islands of Shetland